The 1938 World Table Tennis Championships women's doubles was the eleventh edition of the women's doubles championship.
Věra Votrubcová and Vlasta Depetrisová defeated Dora Beregi and Ida Ferenczy in the final by three sets to one.

Results

See also
 List of World Table Tennis Championships medalists

References

-
-